Western Socialist, Journal of Scientific Socialism in the Western Hemisphere was a regular magazine of the Socialist Party of Canada begun in 1903 then the Socialist Party of Russia (WSM) in 1933, becoming a joint publication with the World Socialist Party of the United States in 1939, before reverting to the Socialist Party of Canada in the mid-1970s and ceasing publication in 1980. Both parties involved were companion parties of the World Socialist Movement and later went on to co-operate on the World Socialist Journal published between 1984-1985.

See also
Socialist Standard

References

Communist periodicals published in the United States
Monthly magazines published in Canada
Defunct political magazines published in Canada
English-language magazines
Magazines established in 1933
Magazines disestablished in 1980
Magazines published in Boston
Magazines published in Manitoba
Mass media in Winnipeg
Socialist magazines